In the United Kingdom, a driving licence is the official document which authorises its holder to operate motor vehicles on highways and other public roads. It is administered in England, Scotland and Wales by the Driver and Vehicle Licensing Agency (DVLA) and in Northern Ireland by the Driver & Vehicle Agency (DVA). A driving licence is required in England, Scotland, and Wales for any person (except the sovereign) driving a vehicle on any highway or other "road", as defined in s.192 Road Traffic Act 1988, irrespective of the ownership of the land over which the road passes. Similar requirements apply in Northern Ireland under the Road Traffic (Northern Ireland) Order 1981.

Prior to the UK leaving the European Union on 31 January 2020 and during the transition period which ended on 31 December 2020, a UK driving licence was a European driving licence, adhering to Directive 2006/126/EC and valid throughout the European Economic Area. A new updated design has been issued from January 2021, now simply reading “UK” in larger blue letters, where the EU flag with the circle of stars surrounding the "UK" code used to be.

Since July 2015, all UK driving licence photocards issued by the DVLA have displayed the Union Jack flag, and since December 2021 also the Royal Coat of Arms on the front of the driving licence. This does not apply to driving licences issued by the DVA in Northern Ireland.

As UK nationals do not normally have identity cards, a photographic driving licence can serve many of the purposes of an identity card in non-driving contexts, such as proof of identity (e.g. when opening a bank account) or of age (e.g. when buying age-restricted goods such as alcohol or tobacco).

Regulations

Provisional Licences and Learner Drivers 

Applications for a provisional driving licence can be made in Great Britain from the age of 15 years and 9 months and in Northern Ireland from 16 years and 10 months. Once a United Kingdom driving test has been passed, the driving licence is valid for driving a moped or light quad bike from age 16, and a car from age 17, or 16 for those who receive, or have applied for, the higher or enhanced rate of the mobility component of PIP or DLA. A driving test consists of three sections: theory, hazard perception and a driving examination. Until this test has been passed, a driver may hold only a provisional licence and is subject to certain conditions.
The conditions attached to provisional licences for a particular category of vehicle are:

 L-plates or (in Wales only) D-plates ("learner") must be conspicuously displayed on the front and rear of the vehicle.
Learner drivers of a particular category and transmission type of vehicle must be accompanied by somebody aged 21 or above who has held a full  driving licence for that category and transmission type for at least three years, except in the case of solo motorcycles and vehicles of certain categories designed solely for one person.
No trailer may be towed, except when driving a tractor or where a full licence gives provisional entitlement to drive a car with trailer, large goods vehicle with trailer or passenger carrying vehicle with trailer.
Motorcycle riders must not carry any pillion passengers.
Coach or bus drivers must not carry any passenger except a person giving or receiving instruction.
Motorways must not be used by holders of car and motorcycle provisional licences, excluding category B (car) licence holders who are learner drivers for the purposes of the trailer category BE, or unless supervised by an Approved Driving Instructor in a car fitted with dual controls.
In Northern Ireland, learner drivers are limited to a speed of 45 mph (72 km/h) and are not permitted on motorways regardless of whether or not they are under instruction by an ADI (Approved Driving Instructor), and drivers who have passed their test within the previous year must display R plates (restricted) and are also limited to a maximum speed of 45 mph (72 km/h) until the expiry of the restricted period. R plates are similar in style to L plates, with a thick-set dark orange R displayed on a white background and most L plates have the orange R on the reverse side.

After passing a driving test, the provisional licence may be surrendered within two years in exchange for a full UK licence for the relevant kind of vehicle. Full car licences allow use of mopeds and motorcycles provided a CBT (Compulsory Basic Training) course is completed (the requirement to have a CBT in Northern Ireland was introduced on 21 February 2011).

Newly qualified drivers 

There are currently no restrictions on newly qualified drivers in England, Wales or Scotland; however if a newly qualified driver receives six penalty points within two years of passing, the licence is automatically revoked and the driver must pass the full test again; this also applies in Northern Ireland. These six points remain on the new licence until their designated expiry time.

In Great Britain, some new drivers may display green "P" plates ("probationary") on their vehicle to alert other drivers that they have recently passed their driving test. This is optional and not a legal requirement and may be displayed for as long as desired. P plates are not commonly used in Northern Ireland.

This is a legal requirement and failure to display R plates is 2 penalty points and a fine. These drivers are known as restricted drivers.

Towing restrictions 
The rules on what a driver can tow are different depending on when they passed their driving test. If they passed their car driving test on or after 1 January 1997, they may drive a car or van up to  maximum authorised mass (MAM) towing a trailer of up to  MAM, and they may tow a trailer over  MAM as long as the combined MAM of the trailer and towing vehicle is no more than  MAM when loaded. They must pass the car and trailer driving test to tow anything heavier. If a driver passed their car test before 1 January 1997, they are usually allowed to drive a vehicle and trailer combination up to  MAM. They are also allowed to drive a minibus with a trailer over  MAM.

On 16 September 2021, the Secretary of State for Transport laid a statutory instrument  to retrospectively grant the B+E (car and trailer) entitlement to all category B licence holders.
An additional legislative
change from the 16th
December 2021 also means
that drivers with B (Car)
entitlement will
automatically have B+E
(Car & Trailer) entitlement
without the need to take a
B+E test. This will allow you
to tow a vehicle up to
3,500kg Maximum
Authorised Mass (MAM).

Other regulations 
Motor car licences issued in the United Kingdom distinguish between automatic and manual transmission vehicles, depending on whether or not a driving test was passed in a vehicle with manual transmission (unless a vehicle test was taken in the UK before such distinction was made). While a manual transmission vehicle licence permits the holder to drive a vehicle of either kind, an automatic transmission vehicle licence is solely for vehicles with automatic transmission. The licence also shows whether a driver requires glasses or contact lenses to meet the legal driving requirements, if known.

Drivers who obtained rights to drive category D1 minibuses before 1997 (by passing a test for the obsolete class A) must not drive such vehicles for hire or reward, nor accept any form of payment in money, goods or kind from any passengers carried.

Category B licences automatically cover both groups C1 (lorries not exceeding 7.5 tomnnes MAM) and D1 but as the holder approaches 45, they must renew their licence. They must provide a doctor's medical report plus an optometrist's report (if the doctor cannot certify the eyesight requirement). Anyone who has C1 and D1 rights on an older paper licence (before the photocard licence) retains the right to drive C1 and D1 without medical evidence until age 70 (so called:grandfather rights). Though like any responsible driver, should have regular eye checks.

There is no maximum age for driving or holding a driving licence, but holders must renew their licences at age 70 and every three years thereafter, at which times they must provide evidence of a medical exam and separate eyesight test if the right to drive C1 and D1 vehicles is to be retained.

History 
Driver registration was introduced in 1903 with the Motor Car Act. Holders of the sulphur-yellow coloured document were entitled to "drive a motor car or motor cycle". The wording was changed in 1930 after which holders were allowed to "drive or steer a motor car or to drive a motor cycle". Shortly afterwards, the document cover was changed to a dark red colour. Holders were for a period entitled to drive a vehicle of "any class or description". Subsequent changes saw the document list precisely those vehicle types for which holders were licensed.

Competency tests were introduced by the Motor Vehicles Regulations 1935 applicable to all drivers who started driving after 1 April 1934. Competency tests were suspended in 1939 for seven years due to the Second World War and in 1956 for one year due to the Suez Crisis. The only person in the United Kingdom who is not required to have a driving licence in order to drive is the King.

Until 1973, driving licences (and tax discs) were issued by local authorities and had to be renewed every three years. In 1971, the decision was taken to computerise the licensing system to enable it to be linked to the Police National Computer and to extend the life of the licence up to the driver's 70th birthday, extendable at intervals thereafter provided the driver can prove fitness.

Except for Northern Ireland, driving licences issued before July 1998 did not have photographs on them. Anyone who holds a licence issued before this date may retain their photo-less licence until expiry (normally one's seventieth birthday) or until they change address, whichever comes sooner. The new plastic photocard driving licences have to be renewed every ten years, for a fee. Until 2015, the licence consisted of both the photocard and a paper counterpart which detailed the individual's driving entitlements and convictions ("endorsements"). The counterpart was abolished on 8 June 2015 and the information formerly recorded on it is now available online via the View Driving Licence service, except in Northern Ireland where the counterpart must be kept with the photocard.

Licences issued to residents of England, Northern Ireland and Scotland appear only in English, while those issued to residents of Wales appear in both English and Welsh. The Union Jack Flag has been included on GB licences since July 2015, but not on Northern Ireland licences. Since December 2021 the Royal Coat of Arms is included on GB licences.

Up until 28 September 2021, the distinguishing sign of the United Kingdom was "GB". The allocation of codes is maintained by the United Nations Economic Commission for Europe, authorised by the UN's Geneva Convention on Road Traffic and the Vienna Convention on Road Traffic. The UK is party to both conventions, and shall hence issue licences in conformity with the conventions. Annex 9 of the Geneva convention states that the distinguishing sign (UK) shall be inscribed in an oval. According to the Vienna convention Article 43 domestic licences have to comply with Annex 6, which says that driving licences shall include the name and/or the distinguishing sign of the country which issued the permit. UK licences did include the "GB" distinguishing code until 1990.

In Directive 91/439/EEC which EU Member States had to implement before 1 July 1994, the UK had to include the emblem of the EU with the code "UK",  instead of "GB" encircled by an ellipse on the front page. As the UK has subsequently withdrawn from the EU, the EU flag is no longer featured on UK driving licences issued after the transition period ended on 31 December 2020. The "GB" code or the ellipse from the aforementioned conventions have not been reintroduced, since January 2021, the licences simply reads “UK" in larger blue letters where the EU flag with the circle of stars surrounding the "UK" code used to be.

On 30 June 2021 the United Nations published a notification stating that the United Kingdom had given three months notification that it intended to change its distinguishing sign from "GB" to "UK". This came into effect on 28 September 2021.

Since December 2021, new driving licence styles were introduced. Changes were made to all versions of the GB driving licence cards and includes:

 The Union Jack flag has been moved to the top right corner
 The Royal Coat of Arms is included on the front
 The driver number is left justified and in line with the other text
 A secondary image of the licence holder is located on the front 
 Colour shifting ink (OVI design) has been reinstated and updated to the back of the licence 
 New hologram has been added
The same changes apply to all versions of the Northern Ireland driving licence, excluding the Union Jack flag and Royal Coat of Arms.

Driver numbers

Great Britain 
Each licence holder in England, Scotland and Wales has a unique driver number, which is 16 characters long. The characters are constructed in the following way:
 1–5: The first five characters of the surname (padded with 9s if fewer than 5 characters). For surnames beginning with "MAC", they are treated as "MC" for all.
 6: The decade digit from the year of birth (e.g. for 1987 it would be 8)
 7–8: The month of birth in two digit format (7th character is incremented by 5 if the driver is female i.e. 51–62 instead of 01–12)
 9–10: The date within the day of birth in two digit format (i.e. 01–31)
 11: The year digit from the year of birth (e.g. for 1987 it would be 7)
 12–13: The first initial of the first and middle name, padded with a 9 if no middle name (e.g. for John Doe Smith JD, for Jane Smith J9)
 14: Arbitrary digit – usually 9, but decremented to differentiate drivers with the first 13 characters in common
 15–16: Two computer check digits which may be letters.
 17–18: Two digits representing the licence issue, which increases by 1 for each licence issued. Not used on previous paper licences.

Northern Ireland 
Driver numbers in Northern Ireland differ from those issued to drivers in GB. 

Each Northern Ireland licence holder is assigned a unique, 8 digit driving licence number, e.g. 12345678. This number is assigned randomly and in no specific order.

Brexit 

The UK left the EU on 31 January 2020, starting an 11-month transition period which terminated on 31 December 2020 in accordance with the Brexit withdrawal agreement. EU law continued to apply to the UK during the transition period, and hence UK driving licences were valid in the EEA and vice versa until 31 December 2020. UK licence holders living in the EU were advised to exchange their UK driving licence for a local one before the transition period ended. The EU flag was removed from UK driving licences when the transition period ended.

From 1 January 2021, with some exceptions, UK licence holders can use their driving licence when visiting EEA countries. International Driving Permits might be needed in some cases, and depending on which convention the country in question has ratified, a 1949 Geneva Convention on Road Traffic IDP might be required in some countries, and a 1968 Vienna Convention on Road Traffic IDP in others. However, none of the EEA countries currently require IDPs for visitors staying shorter than 12 months. EEA countries are no longer obligated to recognise or exchange UK licences if the holder moves to an EEA country, except if the UK has agreed a bilateral agreement with the country.

European driving licences are recognised by the UK if the driving test was passed in an EU/EEA country, and can be used both if the holder is visiting or residing in the country. They can also be exchanged for a UK (both GB and NI) licence.

Driving licence categories

Current categories

This is a list of the categories that might be found on a driving licence in the United Kingdom.

 Notes

Obsolete goods classes

Although the category system was changed over 25 years ago (1 January 1997), the freight industry and driver recruitment agencies still predominantly use the obsolete class numbers for the entitlement of HGV drivers.

The two systems are not exactly compatible, so the descriptions given are only a guideline.

 Class 1: any goods vehicle over 7½ long tons with any trailer.
 Class 2: any rigid goods vehicle over 7½ long tons.
 Class 3: any rigid goods vehicle over 7½ long tons with no more than two axles.

Points and endorsements

The UK uses a cumulative points system for driving offences. Points are added for driving offences by law courts or where the driver accepts a fixed penalty in lieu of prosecution, and the licence is endorsed accordingly. A UK driving licence may be endorsed for various offences, not only for those committed while driving or in charge of a vehicle. If the individual committing the offence does not hold a valid driver's licence the endorsements may be put by until a licence is held.

Most endorsements remain valid for four years; some (such as driving under the influence) are recorded on the licence for 11 years because more severe penalties apply to those convicted twice within 10 years of drink or drug driving offences.

Twelve points on the licence within three years makes the driver liable to disqualification under the "totting-up" procedure; however this is not automatic and must be decided on by a court of law. Endorsements remain on the licence for one year longer than their validity (three or ten years) because a court can consider points awarded even though they are not valid for 'totting up'.

Driving licence codes
Certain codes are included on driving licences to indicate restrictions on use. These codes are listed on the back of the card under the column headed "12. Codes" and are listed for each category that is licensed.

As long as the UK remained within the EU, the codes 1–99 were the same as in the rest of the EU, harmonized by Directive 2006/126/EC.

The codes and their meanings are as follows:

 01 – eyesight correction
 02 – hearing/communication aid
 10 – modified transmission
 15 – modified clutch
 20 – modified braking systems
 25 – modified accelerator systems
 30 – combined braking and accelerator systems ( licences issued before 28 November 2016)
 31 – pedal adaptations and pedal safeguards
 32 – combined service brake and accelerator systems
 33 – combined service brake, accelerator and steering systems
 35 – modified control layouts
 40 – modified steering
 42 – modified rear-view mirror(s)
 43 – modified driving seats
 44 – modifications to motorcycles
 44 (1) – single operated brake
 44 (2) – (adjusted) hand-operated brake (front wheel)
 44 (3) – (adjusted) foot-operated brake (back wheel)
 44 (4) – (adjusted) accelerator handle
 44 (5) – (adjusted) manual transmission and manual clutch
 44 (6) – (adjusted) rear-view mirror(s)
 44 (7) – (adjusted) commands (direction indicators, braking light, etc.)
 44 (8) – seat height allowing the driver, in sitting position, to have 2 feet on the road at the same time
 45 – motorcycles only with sidecar
 46 – tricycles only (for licences issued before 29 June 2014)
 70 – exchange of licence
 71 – duplicate of licence
 78 – restricted to vehicles with automatic transmission
 79 – restricted to vehicles in conformity with the specifications stated in brackets on the licence
 79.02 – restricted to category AM vehicles of the 3-wheel or light quadricycle type
 79.03 – restricted to tricycles
 96 – allowed to drive a vehicle and trailer where the trailer weighs at least 750 kg, and the combined weight of the vehicle and trailer is between 3,500 kg and 4,250 kg
 97 – not allowed to drive category C1 vehicles which are required to have a tachograph fitted
 101 – not for hire or reward (that is, not to make a profit)
 102 – drawbar trailers only
 103 – subject to certificate of competence
 105 – vehicle not more than 5.5 metres long
 106 – restricted to vehicles with automatic transmissions
 107 – not more than 8,250 kilogrammes
 108 – subject to minimum age requirements
 110 – limited to transporting persons with restricted mobility
 111 – limited to 16 passenger seats
 113 – limited to 16 passenger seats except for automatics
 114 – with any special controls required for safe driving
 115 – organ donor
 118 – start date is for earliest entitlement
 119 – weight limit(s) for vehicle do(es) not apply
 121 – restricted to conditions specified in the Secretary of State's notice
 122 – valid on successful completion: Basic Moped Training Course
 125 – tricycles only (for licences issued before 29 June 2014)

Use as proof of identity 

Identity cards for UK nationals were introduced in 2009 on a voluntary basis, and the attempt to introduce a nationwide identity-card scheme in 2010 was reversed mid-course. Its in-progress database was halted and then destroyed. Only workers in certain high-security professions, such as airport workers, were required to have an identity card in 2009, and this remains the case today. Therefore, driving licences, particularly the photocard driving licence introduced in 1998, along with passports, are the most widely used ID documents in the United Kingdom. Most people do not carry their passports with them; this leaves driving licences as the only valid form of ID to be presented. In day-to-day life there is no legal requirement to carry identification whilst driving or otherwise, and most authorities do not arbitrarily ask for identification from individuals.

Non-professional drivers are not legally obliged to carry a driving licence while driving, but section 164 of the Road Traffic Act 1998 allows a police officer to require a driver to produce a driving licence within seven days at a police station chosen by the driver. The form which was once issued in such circumstances, the HO/RT 1, was known colloquially as "a producer", as exemplified in Smiley Culture's hit single "Police Officer".

Exchange agreements 
The UK has an exchange agreement with 22 'designated' countries/regions which allows the holder of a foreign driving licence who is deemed to be resident in the UK to exchange it for a British licence. Initially, there were 18 such countries/regions, but an additional four, namely Taiwan, the United Arab Emirates, Ukraine and the Republic of North Macedonia, were added from 20 May 2021. 
To do such licence exchange, the holder must send the licence, a translation thereof if required, an application form and a fee to the DVLA or DVA (for Northern Ireland). 

 The countries/regions are: Andorra, Australia, Barbados, British Virgin Islands, Canada, Cayman Islands, Falkland Islands, Faroe Islands, Gibraltar, Hong Kong, Japan, Monaco, New Zealand, Republic of Korea, Republic of North Macedonia, Singapore, South Africa, Switzerland, Taiwan, Ukraine,  United Arab Emirates, and Zimbabwe

Post-Brexit arrangements 
The UK and Ireland have signed a bilateral agreement, allowing those holding a UK driving licence and living in Ireland to continue to be able to swap it for an Irish licence after the Brexit transition period ended on 31 December 2020.

The UK and Norway have agreed to continue existing arrangements on mutual recognition of driving licences after Brexit.

See also
 European driving licence
 British passport
 Vehicle registration plates of the United Kingdom

References

External links 
 DVLA England, Scotland and Wales driver information website
 DVA Northern Ireland driver licensing website
 Driving licence codes

United Kingdom
Licence
Identity documents of the United Kingdom